The 6th TCA Awards were presented by the Television Critics Association. The ceremony was held on July 20, 1990, at the Century Plaza Hotel in Los Angeles, Calif.

Winners and nominees

Multiple wins 
The following shows received multiple wins:

Multiple nominations 
The following shows received multiple nominations:

References

External links
Official website
1990 TCA Awards at IMDb.com

1990 television awards
1990 in American television
TCA Awards ceremonies